Batka may refer to:

 Bátka, a village and municipality in southern Slovakia
 Bat'ka (Батька), nickname for Belarusian president Alexander Lukashenko
 Beda Batka (1922–1994), Czech-American cinematographer
 Richard Batka (1868–1922), Jewish Czech-Austrian musicologist, music critic and librettist for Der Kuhreigen